I Could Use Another You is the fifth studio album by American country music singer Eddy Raven. It was released by RCA Nashville in June 1984. The album contains the singles "I Got Mexico", "I Could Use Another You", and "She's Gonna Win Your Heart".

Content and reception
The album was one of the first production credits for Paul Worley, then primarily known for his work as a session guitarist. The album accounted for three singles on the Hot Country Songs charts: "I Got Mexico", which was Raven's first number 1 hit there, followed by the title track and "She's Gonna Win Your Heart".

Cash Box magazine described the title track as "an upbeat tune stressing Raven’s clear, distinct vocals." Writing for Stereo Review magazine (now known as Sound & Vision), Alanna Nash noted that while it had fewer songs written by Raven and a "slightly more mainstream" sound than its predecessors, the album was "well up to his own high standards", while also considering Raven's singing more upbeat and confident than on previous efforts.

Track listing

Personnel
Adapted from liner notes.

Musicians
 Eddie Bayers - drums
 Dennis Burnside - keyboards, synthesizer
 Don Gant - background vocals
 Shane Keister - synthesizer
 Frank J. Myers - acoustic guitar
 Joe Osborn - bass guitar (all tracks except 5)
 Larry Paxton - bass guitar (track 5)
 Eddy Raven - lead vocals
 James Stroud - drums
 Dennis Wilson - background vocals
 Paul Worley - electric guitar, acoustic guitar
 Reggie Young - electric guitar

Technical
 Barnes & Co. - album graphics
 George Clinton - assistant engineer
 Lee Groltzsch - assistant engineer
 Hollis Halford - assistant engineer
 Vicki Hicks - assistant engineer
 Deb Mahalanobis - album design and lettering
 Randy Martin - illustration
 Glenn Meadows - mastering
 Marshall Morgan - engineer, mixing
 Eric Prestidge - engineer, mixing
 Eddy Raven - producer
 Joe Scaife - engineer
 Mark Tucker - photography
 Paul Worley - producer

Chart performance

References

1984 albums
Eddy Raven albums
RCA Records albums
Albums produced by Paul Worley